Gaston Aspa (born 17 August 1880, date of death unknown) was a French boxer. He competed in the men's middleweight event at the 1908 Summer Olympics.

References

External links

1880 births
Year of death missing
French male boxers
Olympic boxers of France
Boxers at the 1908 Summer Olympics
Sportspeople from Haute-Garonne
Middleweight boxers